Samuel Anso Manson is a Ghanaian politician and was a member of the first parliament of the second Republic of Ghana. He represented the Dormaa constituency under the membership of the Progress Party (PP)

Early life and education 
Manson was born on 26 December 1936. He attended the University of Heidelberg where he obtained a Doctor of Philosophy in Research Fellow. He later worked as a Research Fellow before going to serve at the Parliament of Ghana.

Politics 
Manson began his political career in 1969 when he became the parliamentary candidate for the Progress Party (PP) to represent his constituency in the Parliament of Ghana prior to the commencement of the 1969 Ghanaian parliamentary election.

He was sworn into the First Parliament of the Second Republic of Ghana on 1 October 1969 after being pronounced winner at the 1969 Ghanaian election held on 26 August 1969 and his tenure of office ended on 13 January 1972.

Personal life 
He is not committed to any religion or faith.

References 

Ghanaian MPs 1969–1972
Living people
1936 births
Progress Party (Ghana) politicians
Heidelberg University alumni
People from Brong-Ahafo Region